St. Thomas the Apostle Church is a historic site at 5472 S. Kimbark Avenue in Hyde Park, Chicago, Illinois, at 55th Street.

A Roman Catholic church of the Archdiocese of Chicago, it was built in 1922 and opened in 1925 and added to the National Register of Historic Places in 1978. It was designed by Barry Byrne, who was a student of Frank Lloyd Wright and incorporated elements from Wright's Prairie School of design and from the modernist movement. Byrne had previously built the convent at St. Thomas Apostle in 1919.  It was built during a period of liturgical renewal that was just reaching the U.S.  It is often cited as anticipating the liturgical reforms of the Second Vatican Council by some 40 years due to its projecting altar and lack of interior columns.

References

External links 

 Official website

Properties of religious function on the National Register of Historic Places in Chicago
Roman Catholic churches completed in 1919
Roman Catholic churches in Chicago
Churches on the National Register of Historic Places in Illinois
Hyde Park, Chicago
20th-century Roman Catholic church buildings in the United States